Hélène Bouchet (born 1980) is a French ballet dancer is a principal dancer at the Hamburg Ballet.

Early life
Bouchet was born in Cannes in the south of France. She studied ballet at École supérieure de danse de Cannes Rosella Hightower and at the École Nationale de Danse in Marseille under Raymond Franchetti and Dominique Khalfouni.

Career
After dancing with the Roland Petit's Ballet National de Marseille and English National Ballet, she joined the Hamburg Ballet in 1998. She became a soloist in 2003 and principal dancer in 2005. She had originated a number of roles in John Neumeier's works, including La Barbarina in Death in Venice, Tatiana Larina in Tatiana  and Eurydice in Orpheus. She won the Prix Benois de la Danse for the latter.

As a guest artists, she took part in the Tokyo Ballet's 50-year anniversary celebrations, dancing the title role in Romeo and Juliet with Thiago Bordin, and Jewels with the Mariinsky Ballet, as well as in Germany, France, Japan, Luxembourg, U.S., Russia and Argentina. In 2003, wearing a Gypsy dress, Bouchet performed "The Gipsy Tunes" in Mougins, France, with her sister, Diane Bouchet, on violin.

Selected repertoire

Marguerite Gautier, Manon Lescaut and Olympia in Lady of the Camellias
Myrtha, Moyna, Zulma and Paesant-Pas de deux in Giselle
Princess Natalia, Princess Claire and The Butterfly in Illusions - like Swan Lake
Louise, Marie, The Beautiful Girl from Granada, La Fille du Pharaon and Mrs. Stahlbaum in The Nutcracker
The good Fairy, A Fairy, Princess Florine and Amors Segen in The Sleeping Beauty
Hippolyta/Titania und Helena in A Midsummer Night's Dream
Romola Nijinsky, Tamara Karsavina und Olga Preobrajenska in Nijinsky
Juliet in Romeo and Juliet
Aschenbach's Concepts in Death in Venice
A Stepsister in A Cinderella Story
The Little Mermaid and Henriette/The Princess in The Little Mermaid

Desdemona in Othello
Sylvia in Sylvia
Julie in Liliom
Blanche DuBois in A Streetcar Named Desire
The mother in Christmas Oratorio I-VI
Woman I in Bernstein Dances
Dolly in Anna Karenina
Gamzatti in La Bayadère
The Sylph in La Sylphide
Pink and Mauve in Dances at a Gathering
Tatiana in Onegin
Third Simphony of Gustav Mahler
Afternoon of a Faun
Saint Matthew Passion
Song of the Earth
Jewels – Emerald, Rubies and Diamonds
Tchaikovsky Pas de deux
Thaïs

Created roles
Silvia in Préludes CV
La Barbarina in Death in Venice
Eurydice in Orpheus
Alma in Purgatorio
Tatiana Larina in Tatiana
The Servant (Désirée von Wertheimstein) in Duse
Nocturnes and Nachtwanderung from Songs of the Night
Verklungene Feste
Night and Echo
Unerreichbare Orte
Wege
A Foreign Sound
My Dear Love
Renku
Countdown

Awards
Silver medal, Varna International Ballet Competition, 2002
Dr. Wilhelm-Oberdörffer-Prize, 2004
Prix Benois de la Danse, 2010

References

1980 births
Prima ballerinas
French ballerinas
Prix Benois de la Danse winners
Living people
People from Cannes
French expatriates in Germany
English National Ballet dancers
21st-century French ballet dancers